Crispy Crunch is a hard chocolate bar with a crispy peanut butter flake inside that is made by Cadbury in Canada. Harold Oswin, an employee of William Neilson, developed "Crispy Crunch" in 1930.

History 
Harold Oswin was a candy roller in Neilson's hard candy room and joined the company when he was fourteen years old. Harold was promoted to Candy maker in the late 1920s. He always had wanted to create a candy bar with peanut butter and so when a chocolate bar contest was announced, he submitted his concept. Harold won the contest and received a $5.00 prize. The original recipe called for a log-shaped bar. Williams Neilson management made the decision to flatten the bar to the shape that it is today. Oswin died in the mid-1990s.

The brand was repositioned in 1988 by Norm Williams, Director of Marketing. The new brief was given to Martin Shewchuck of Leo Burnett Canada who conceived the highly successful Crispy Crunch campaigns ("the only thing better than your Crispy Crunch is someone else's"). The campaign catapulted the brand from No. 10 to No. 1, growing volume by 55%.

Crispy Crunches were sold in the United States for a brief time in the 1990s by the food distribution arm of Pro Set, the collectible card company. Pro Set went bankrupt, resulting in Crispy Crunch no longer being available in the United States. A lower-calorie version of Crispy Crunch was available for a limited time in the mid-1990s.

The original manufacturers, Neilson, sold its chocolate brands to Cadbury in 1996, though packaging continued to feature the Neilson logo for a few years. Since Cadbury began manufacturing of the chocolate bar, the recipe has changed in that it is less salty and more sweet as it has more of the crunchy topaz-coloured candy coating around the centre.

See also
 List of chocolate bar brands

References

External links 
 Official website (archived)

Chocolate bars
Canadian confectionery
Peanut butter confectionery